Pradip Gogoi (Assamese: প্ৰদীপ গগৈ) (alias Samiran Gogoi) is the Vice-Chairman of the outlawed outfit ULFA in Assam. He is also one of the founder members of the outfit. He was arrested in Kolkata by West Bengal Police on 8 April 1998 and put in judicial custody at Guwahati. A former electricity board employee Gogoi hails from Sibsagar district of Assam. Since his arrest he has been facing 6 TADA cases.

Charges
Cases registered against him are:

Bail granted
On 19 February 2010, TADA judge Soneka Bora of the designated TADA court at Guwahati granted Gogoi bail in three cases—Tada sessions case numbers 1/90, 42/01 and 43/01 — against a surety of Rs 1 lakh for each case. He was granted the bail on conditions that he would not travel abroad till the disposal of the cases, would deposit his passport in the court and not leave the area under the jurisdiction of the without prior permission from the court and if he decides to live in Sivasagar, his hometown, he must regularly report to the police there. The decision of the other cases registered against him will be heard on 23 February 2010.

See also
ULFA
Sanjukta Mukti Fouj
People's Consultative Group
List of top leaders of ULFA

References

People from Sivasagar
Living people
Indian prisoners and detainees
Prisoners and detainees of India
Prisoners and detainees from Assam
ULFA members
Year of birth missing (living people)